is an island in the Seto Inland Sea administered under Naruto in Tokushima Prefecture.

Geography
Ōge-jima, also called Ōge Island, is located in the northeast of Tokushima Prefecture, on the island of Shikoku, Japan . Together with Taka-shima and Shimada-jima, the island to which it is connected by the Horikoshi Bridge, it forms the northeast part of Naruto. It is connected to the island of Shikoku by the Konaruto Bridge, and, by the Ōnaruto Bridge spanning the Naruto Strait, to Awaji Island, an island in the Seto Inland Sea.

References

Islands of Tokushima Prefecture
Islands of the Seto Inland Sea